Novatrivia is a genus of small sea snails, marine gastropod molluscs in the family Triviidae, the false cowries or trivias.

Species
 Novatrivia far Fehse, 2015
 Novatrivia mirabilis Fehse, 2015
 Novatrivia taiwanica Fehse, 2015

Distribution
This marine genus occurs off Taiwan, the Philippines and French Polynesia.

References

 Fehse D. (2015). Contributions to the knowledge of Triviidae, XXIX-B. New Triviidae from the Philippines. Visaya. supplement 5: 17-47.

External links
 

Triviidae